The 2022 TCR Australia Series (known for sponsorship reasons as the 2022 Supercheap Auto TCR Australia Series) was the third season of the TCR Australia Touring Car Series. The series ran as part of the Motorsport Australia Championships series.

Calendar

Teams and Drivers

Summary

Points system

 Two (2) points will be awarded for obtaining Pole Position in qualifying.

Drivers' standings

Notes

References

External links 
Official website
2022 Supercheap Auto TCR Australia Series Sporting Regulations, www.motorsport.org.au, as archived at web.archive.org

Australia
TCR Australia